For the U.S.-based cargo airline which operated from 1966 to 1972, see Universal Airlines (United States).

Universal Airlines was an airline based in Georgetown, Guyana and headquartered in Richmond Hill, New York. The airline operated a scheduled passenger service to the United States and to nearby Trinidad and Tobago until going bankrupt. Operations were suspended in 2005.

History
The airline was established by Guyanese sisters Chandramatie Harpaul and Ramashree Singh to replace the defunct Guyana Airways in 2001. Operations started on  December 13, 2001, with a Boeing 767-300ER leased from LOT Polish Airlines non-stop from New York City to Georgetown. The company was financed by 11 investors from Guyana.

Catering mainly to Guyanese in the US, the airline focused on the specific needs of this customer base, offering larger baggage allowances and a non-stop route.

It subsequently leased an Airbus A320-200 from TACA Airlines, but this was repossessed in 2005 and Universal Airlines was forced to suspend operations on August 29, 2005. BWIA West Indies Airways assisted stranded passengers during that time.

Destinations
Universal Airlines flew to the following destinations:

Manaus (Eduardo Gomes International Airport)Georgetown (Cheddi Jagan International Airport) Hub 
Fort Lauderdale (Fort Lauderdale–Hollywood International Airport)
New York City (John F. Kennedy International Airport)Paramaribo (Johan Adolf Pengel International Airport)'''
Piarco (Piarco International Airport)

Fleet
Universal Airlines operated the following aircraft:

See also
List of defunct airlines of Guyana

References

External links
  via Wayback Machine

Defunct airlines of Guyana
Airlines established in 2001
Airlines disestablished in 2005
2001 establishments in Guyana
2005 disestablishments in Guyana